Here Today, Tomorrow Next Week! is the second studio album by Icelandic alternative rock band the Sugarcubes, released in September 1989 through Elektra Records. A version of the album sung in Icelandic titled Illur Arfur! (English: Bad Legacy!) was released as well, with the same English track listing, under the name of Sykurmolarnir (Sugarcubes in Icelandic). The album reached number 70 on the US Billboard 200, number 15 on the UK Albums Chart and number one on the UK Indie Albums chart. The album was not as well received by critics as their critically acclaimed debut album, Life's Too Good, and was criticized for Einar's greater vocal contribution.

The album spawned three singles: "Regina", which reached number two on the Billboard Modern Rock Tracks chart, "Tidal Wave" and "Planet". Music videos were released for all three singles, as well as "Eat the Menu".

The name of the album was inspired by Mr. Toad from the famous children's book The Wind in the Willows.

Track listing

Notes
 The bonus tracks do not appear on the LP edition.
 "Hot Meat" is a reworking of "Coldsweat" from the band's debut album, Life's Too Good, as well as the B-side of "Regina".

Personnel
The Sugarcubes
 Björk Guðmundsdóttir – vocals
 Einar Örn Benediktsson – vocals, trumpet
 Þór Eldon Jónsson – guitar
 Margrét Örnólfsdóttir – keyboards
 Bragi Ólafsson – bass
 Sigtryggur Baldursson – drums and percussion

Additional personnel

 Baritone Saxophone (track 1) – Nigel Hitchcock
 Brass, Arranged By (track 1) – Ólafur Gaukur
 Tenor saxophone (track 1) – Gary Barnacle
 Trombone (track 1) – Pete Thomas
 Trombone bass (track 1) – Kenny Hamilton
 Trumpet (track 1) – John Thirkell, Stewart Brooks
 Cello (track 13) – Anthony Pleeth, Ben Kennard, Martin Loveday, Paul Kegg
 Viola (track 13) – David Emanuel, Garfield Jackson, George Robertson, Levine Andrade
 Violin (track 13) – Barry Wilde, Ben Cruft, Bill Benham, David Woodcock, Elizabeth Edwards, Mark Berrow, Peter Oxer, Roger Garland, Wilfred Gibson
 Lead Violin (track 13) – Gavyn Wright
 Strings Conductor, Arranged By (track 13) – Chris Cameron 
 Contractor (track 13) – Isobel Griffiths
 Strings recording (track 13) – Mike Ross-Trevor
 Mixing – Pétur Gíslason (tracks 1, 7, 8), Derek Birkett (tracks 2, 4–6, 9–13), Siggi Baldursson (track 3)
 Production – Derek Birkett, The Sugarcubes
 Recording – Brian Pugsley
 Additional recording – Brad Grisdale, Gail Lambourne, Gerard Johnson (track 1), Gordon Milne, Ian Horne, Julian Withers, Karen White, Phil Bodger, Will Gosling
 Technical assistance – Paul Ellis
 Publisher – Second Wind
 Artwork – Keli Kaldi, Óskar Storm
 Layout – Designland
 Outside photo – Aged Rings
 Inside photo – Andrew Catlin
 Sleeve design – Keli Kaldi and Óskar Strom

Charts

References

The Sugarcubes albums
1989 albums
Elektra Records albums
Albums recorded at Berry Street Studio